Bunbury Airport  is an airport servicing the Western Australian city of Bunbury. The airport is used largely as a facility for General Aviation, pilot training and emergency services. Bunbury Airport serves an area that includes the City of Bunbury and the surrounding districts of Harvey, Dardanup, Capel and Donnybrook-Balingup.

History
The City of Bunbury is the owner and operator of Bunbury Airport. Council first investigated the possibility of an airstrip in 1965 and with the help of a band of enthusiastic aviators and input from the Department of Civil Aviation, the airstrip became operational in 1969. It has evolved to present day with council funds, government grants/funds, and operational input from the Bunbury Aero Club. The aerodrome is a 'registered' airport with the Civil Aviation Safety Authority (CASA).

Recent upgrades to the airport include the following:
 
 2008 - construction of a new Patient Transfer Building to provide better facilities for the approximate 750 annual visits by the Royal Flying Doctor Service (RFDS).
 2009 - development of an additional 15 hangar sites.
 2010 - construction of a 700 metre long parallel taxiway.
 2012 - construction of run-up bays and a helipad.
 2013 - installation of LED runway and taxiway lighting.
 2015 - development of an additional 20 hangar sites.
 2016 - construction of a rescue helicopter base.
 2017 - installation of an Automatic Weather Information Station (AWIS).
 2018 - installation of a weather camera, construction of a helipad and installation of a secondary IWI.

Operations and facilities
Due to the proximity of the South Western Highway, there is a  permanently displaced threshold at the runway 25 end to allow sufficient clearance over the road. Runway 07/25 is equipped with low intensity, pilot activated runway lighting for night operations. There is no control tower and pilots must co-ordinate arrivals and departures using a Common Traffic Advisory Frequency.

Three flying schools and 1 facility operate out of Bunbury Airport, they are: AirChartersWest, Bunbury Aero Club, Bunbury Flying School and AirSportsWA. The schools and airport are a major Recreational Aviation Australia approved flight training facility.

Bunbury Airport currently averages 13,000 aircraft movements per annum. The airport is home to a permanent rescue helicopter base operated by the Department of Fire & Emergency Services, seasonal water bombers operated by the Parks & Wildlife Services section of the Department of Biodiversity, Conservation and Attractions and significant visitation by the Royal Flying Doctor Service (RFDS).

See also
 List of airports in Western Australia
 Aviation transport in Australia

References

External links
City of Bunbury
 Department of Environment and Conservation
 RFDS
 Airservices Aerodromes & Procedure Charts

Airports in Western Australia
RA-Aus Approved Flight Training Facilities
Airports established in 1969
Bunbury, Western Australia
Buildings and structures in Bunbury, Western Australia